Febreze is an American brand of household odor eliminators manufactured by Procter & Gamble. It is sold in North America, South America, Europe, Africa, Asia, Australia, and New Zealand.

First introduced in test markets in March 1996, the fabric refresher product has been sold in the United States since June 1998, and the line has since branched out to include air fresheners (Air Effects), plug-in oil (Noticeables), scented disks (Scentstories), odor-eliminating candles, and automotive air fresheners.

The name Febreze is a portmanteau of the words "fabric" and "breeze". The name is a popular example of the Mandela effect, with many people claiming to remember the name being previously spelled "Febreeze", despite there being no indication or evidence of the product name having actually been changed.

In many non-English speaking countries, the products are sold as Ambi pur.

Ingredients 

The active ingredient in several Febreze products is hydroxypropyl beta-cyclodextrin (HPβCD). The molecule traps and binds volatilized hydrocarbons within its structural ring, retaining malodorous molecules, which reduces their volatility and thus the perception of their scent. The active ingredient is produced from corn cobs. The use of cyclodextrin as a sprayable odor absorber was patented by Procter & Gamble.

The products include additional ingredients such as emulsifiers, preservatives, and perfumes. Benzisothiazolinone is a preservative included in some of the products.

Lines 
There are many types of Febreze branded products. For example, the main Febreze products are air freshener sprays, which are claimed to have a disinfectant effect. There are specialized ones for odor from pets, for cars, and for fabric. Some are aromatic and others are odorless.
Air Effects
Bedroom Mist
Fabric Refresher
Febreze ONE Fabric
Bedding Refresher
NOTICEables
3VOLUTION
Bedroom Diffuser
Bedside Diffuser
Set&Refresh
Stick&Refresh
CAR Vent Clip
Candles
Wax melts
Sleep Serenity
In other countries, there are Febreze products for house dust and toilet facilities.

Marketing
The product was initially marketed as a way to get rid of unpleasant smells. It sold poorly until P&G realised that people become accustomed to smells in their own homes, and stop noticing them even when they are overpowering (like the smell of several cats in a single household). The marketing then switched to linking it to pleasant smells and good cleaning habits instead, which resulted in a massive increase in sales. Only after the product became well established in the marketplace did the marketing go back to emphasising odour elimination properties as well.

The Veterinary toxicology experts working for the ASPCA Animal Poison Control Center consider Febreze fabric freshener products to be safe for use in homes with pet dogs, cats, ferrets, rabbits, and rodents. However, the package labeling indicates that the product is considered not safe around birds, and results from testing with other animals are not indicated.

See also 
Olfactory fatigue, referred to as "nose blind" in advertising campaign

References

External links 
 
 Material Safety Datasheet for Febreze

Procter & Gamble brands
Cleaning product brands
Perfumes
Products introduced in 1996